East Ypsilanti, Michigan was a village along the east side of the Huron River in Washtenaw County, Michigan from 1844 until 1858.  It broke off from the rest of Ypsilanti in 1844 due to a dispute over taxes and remained a separate village until the city was formed in 1858.

Sources

1844 establishments in Michigan
Populated places established in 1844
Former villages in Michigan
1858 disestablishments in the United States
Populated places disestablished in 1858